Richard Charles Sutch (born 1942 - 2019) was a professor of economics at the University of California Riverside. He is noted for his work on the economic analysis of U.S. slavery and emancipation. He was awarded a "Clio" Award For Exceptional Support to the Field of Cliometrics, by the Cliometric Society and his work has received recognition by the Economic History Association via its awarding him the Arthur H. Cole Prize for the Outstanding Article in The Journal of Economic History. Over the period 1989-1990 he served as the president of the Economic History Association.

Selected publications

 Sutch, Richard with Thomas G. Rawski, Susan B. Carter, Jon S. Cohen, Stephen Cullenberg, Peter H. Lindert, Donald N. McCloskey, and Hugh Rockoff. (1996) Economics and the Historian, Berkeley: University of California Press.

References

External links

1942 births
Living people
21st-century American economists
MIT School of Humanities, Arts, and Social Sciences alumni
Economic historians
University of Washington College of Arts and Sciences alumni
Presidents of the Economic History Association